Jürgen Wähling (born 6 December 1940), is a German former footballer player and manager.

Honours

Manager
AGF
 Danish Superliga: 1986

References

External links

1940 births
Living people
German footballers
Footballers from Hamburg
Association football forwards
Bundesliga players
FC Luzern players
SC Tasmania 1900 Berlin players
German football managers
Bundesliga managers
2. Bundesliga managers
Danish Superliga managers
SV Werder Bremen II managers
Boldklubben 1909 managers
Vejle Boldklub managers
Esbjerg fB managers
Aarhus Gymnastikforening managers
Hannover 96 managers
Trabzonspor managers
German expatriate football managers
German expatriate sportspeople in Denmark
Expatriate football managers in Denmark